Whiskey Creek or Whisky Creek may refer to:

Whisky Creek (Red River of the North), a stream in Minnesota
Whiskey Creek, Florida, a census-designated place in Lee County, Florida
Whisky Creek (Touchet River), a stream in Washington
Whiskey Creek, a tributary of the American River, along the Sierra Crest